The Othello Outlook was a newspaper based out of Othello, Washington. The paper was originally founded as Othello Progress News in 1947 under publisher John A. Jenson. The paper was renamed as the Othello Outlook in 1951. Under both names, newspapers were produced on a weekly basis. The newspaper ceased publication in July 2016.

Former staff 
Publisher:

 John A. Jenson
 Warren Baslee
 Dan Leary
 Eric LaFontaine

Proof-reading and bookkeeping:

 Jean Leary

References 

Newspapers published in Washington (state)
Defunct weekly newspapers
Adams County, Washington